Psychristus belkab is a species of ground beetle from the Harpalinae subfamily that is endemic to Yunnan province of China.

References

Beetles described in 2009
Endemic fauna of Yunnan
Insects of China
Beetles of Asia